Teen Bata Teen (or 3 Bata 3) ( Lit: Three divided by Three) was a 1995 Pakistani comedy-drama sitcom which was written by Adeel Hashmi and directed by Jawad Bashir. It was the first television sitcom of Pakistan. It was aired on Pakistan Television Corporation (PTV One, now PTV Home).

Overview
Teen Bata Teen was aired in 1995 on PTV Home and it starred Ali Tahir, Adeel Hashmi, Faisal Qureshi, Mira Hashmi, Wajiha Tahir and Fatima. This sitcom, featuring a trio of roommates, became very popular and was also named as the first television sitcom aired in Pakistan.

Cast
Main
 Ali Tahir as Johnny
 Adeel Hashmi as Lucy
 Shahid Mehmood as Timmy
 Mira Hashmi as Mehreen
 Wajiha Tahir as Beenish
 Fatima Ahmed Khan as Zara
Recurring
 Faisal Qureshi as Shaffu
Supporting characters
 Salman Shahid as Kharoos Buddha
 Rihana Siddiqui
 Ibrahim as Doodh Waala
 Moattar Asim Bukhari as Naani Amma
 Jawad Bashir as Various
 Saba Hameed as herself
 Nadia Jamil as herself

Season 2
 Omair Rana as Johnny

References

External links

Pakistani drama television series
Pakistani comedy television series
Urdu-language television shows
Pakistan Television Corporation original programming
Pakistani television sitcoms